Lacelle is a commune in the Corrèze department of central France.

Geography

Location
Commune of Massif Central located on the Plateau de Millevaches in the Regional Nature Park of Millevaches in the Limousin. It is adjacent to the Haute-Vienne department.

Population

See also
Communes of the Corrèze department

References

Communes of Corrèze